Henry Trotter is the name of:

Henry Trotter (British Army officer) (1844–1905), major general
Henry Trotter (Indian Army officer) (1841–1919), officer in the Royal Bengal Engineers and central Asian explorer
Henry Dundas Trotter (1802–1859), Scottish Royal Navy rear-admiral
Henry John Trotter (1835–1888), English barrister, railway director and Conservative politician

See also
Edward Henry Trotter (1872–1916), First World War British Army lieutenant-colonel; son of the major general